William Hunter (15 July 1892 – 6 November 1974) was a British hurdler. He competed in the men's 110 metres hurdles at the 1920 Summer Olympics.

References

1892 births
1974 deaths
Athletes (track and field) at the 1920 Summer Olympics
British male hurdlers
British male high jumpers
British male long jumpers
Olympic athletes of Great Britain
Place of birth missing